The Apostolic Vicariate of Tripoli is a Latin Church missionary territory or apostolic vicariate of the Catholic Church in Tripolitania, Libya.

It is immediately exempt to the Holy See, depending on the Roman Congregation for the Evangelization of Peoples, and not part of any ecclesiastical province

Although still named after its episcopal see, it has no cathedral since Tripoli Cathedral was converted into a mosque. Currently the temporary cathedral is the pro-cathedral of St. Francis located in the city of Tripoli that simultaneously serves as a parish church.

History 

 Established in 1630 as Apostolic Prefecture of Tripoli, on territory canonically split off from the (Spanish colonial) Diocese of Islas Canarias.
 Promoted and renamed in 1894 as Apostolic Vicariate of Libya, hence entitled to a titular bishop.
 Renamed on February 3, 1927 as Apostolic Vicariate of Tripolitana, having lost territory to establish the Apostolic Vicariate of Cyrenaica (later renamed Benghazi, after its see).
 June 22, 1939: Renamed as Apostolic Vicariate of Tripoli , having lost more Libyan territory to establish the Apostolic Prefecture of Misurata.

Statistics 

, it pastorally served 50,000 Catholics (0.8% of 6,204,000 total) on 1,000,000 km² in one cathedral parish and 15 missions with 5 priests (1 diocesan, 4 religious), and 18 lay religious (6 brothers, 12 sisters).

Ordinaries 
All members of the Friars Minor, O.F.M.

Apostolic Prefects of Tripoli 
 Friar Pascal Canto, OFM (1643–?)
 Pietro Tognoletto da Palermo, OFM (?–?)
 Girolamo da Castelvetrano, OFM (1675–?)
 Maurizio da Lucca, OFM (1691–1698)
 Giovanni Francesco da Varese, OFM (1698 – 7 July 1700)
 Nicolò da Chio, OFM (17 August 1700 – February 1707)
 Francesco Maria da Sarzana, OFM (1707 – 9 April 1713)
 Pietro da Castelfranco, OFM (21 August 1713 – 1719?)
 Gian Andrea da Vignolo, OFM (1719?–?)
 Bernardino da Lucca, OFM (1746–1748)
 Benvenuto da Rose, OFM (?–1783)
 Clemente da Montalboldo, OFM (1783–1788?)
 Candido di Genova, OFM (?–?)
 Gaudenzio da Trento, OFM (1790?–1795)
 Pacifico da Monte Cassiano, OFM (1800?–?)
 Benedetto da San Donato, OFM (?–1824)
 Filippo da Coltibuono, OFM (?–1832)
 Venanzio da San Venanzio, OFM (1843–?)
 Ludovico da Modena, OFM (?–1843)
 Angelo Maria da Sant'Agata, OFM (?–1869)

Apostolic Vicars of Libya 
 Carlo da Borgo Giovi, O.F.M (?–1899)
 Giuseppe Bevilacqua da Barrafranca, O.F.M (?–1904)
 Bonaventura Rossetti, O.F.M (August 1907 – ?)
 Ludovico Antomelli, O.F.M (23 February 1913 – 10 March 1919), appointed Bishop of Bagnoregio (Bagnorea), Italy
 Giacinto Tonizza, O.F.M (7 August 1919 – 3 February 1927 see below)

Apostolic Vicar of Tripolitania 
 Giacinto Tonizza, O.F.M (see above 3 February 1927 – 16 April 1935)

Apostolic Vicars of Tripoli 
 Camillo Vittorino Facchinetti, O.F.M (9 March 1936 – 25 December 1950)
 Vitale Bonifacio Bertoli, O.F.M (5 April 1951 – 10 March 1967)
 Guido Attilio Previtali, O.F.M (26 June 1969 – 3 May 1985)
 Giovanni Innocenzo Martinelli, O.F.M (3 May 1985 – 5 February 2017)
 George Bugeja, O.F.M (5 February 2017 – )

Sources and external links 
 GCatholic.org, with incumbent biographical links, Google map and - satellite photo
 Catholic Hierarchy

References 

Roman Catholic dioceses in Libya
Religious organizations established in the 1630s
Apostolic vicariates
Apostolic Vicariate
Roman Catholic dioceses and prelatures established in the 17th century